Thomas Frederick Jones (born April 16, 1955)  is a former starting pitcher in Major League Baseball who played from  through  for the Boston Red Sox (1976) and Seattle Mariners (1977–78).
 
He was traded along with Enrique Romo and Tom McMillan from the Mariners to the Pittsburgh Pirates for Mario Mendoza, Odell Jones and Rafael Vásquez at the Winter Meetings on December 5, 1978.

In a three-year career, Jones posted a 6–9 record with 72 strikeouts and a 4.02 ERA in 159.0 innings of work.

Following his career in the majors, Jones pitched one more season in the minor leagues in 1979 for the Portland Beavers of the Pacific Coast League.

References

External links
, or Retrosheet, or Baseball Reference (Minor and Mexican leagues), or Pura Pelota (Venezuelan Winter League)

1955 births
Living people
American expatriate baseball players in Mexico
Baseball players from Jacksonville, Florida
Boston Red Sox players
Bristol Red Sox players
Elmira Pioneers players
Major League Baseball pitchers
Mexican League baseball pitchers
Navegantes del Magallanes players
American expatriate baseball players in Venezuela
Portland Beavers players
Rhode Island Red Sox players
San Jose Missions players
Seattle Mariners players
Tigres del México players
Wichita Aeros players
Winston-Salem Red Sox players
Winter Haven Red Sox players